Owen Reed Lovejoy, Jr. (September 9, 1866 - June 29, 1961) was a minister who opposed child labor. He was known as the "children's statesman". He served as the general secretary of the National Child Labor Committee from 1907 to 1926.

Biography
He was born on September 9, 1866 in Jamestown, Michigan to Hiram Reed Lovejoy, Sr. and Harriett Helen Robinson. He attended Albion College. On June 30, 1892 he married Jennie Evelyn Campbell and they had five children, but only two of his sons survived to adulthood. In 1904 he joined the National Child Labor Committee and served until 1926. He then went to work for the Children's Aid Society. His wife died in 1929. In 1937 he married Kate Calkins Drake. He retired in 1939 and moved to Biglerville, Pennsylvania.

He died on June 29, 1961 in Biglerville, Pennsylvania.

References

Albion College alumni
Children's rights activists
Child labour
1866 births
1961 deaths